Marien Ngouabi (or N'Gouabi) (December 31, 1938 – March 18, 1977) was the third President of the Republic of the Congo from January 1, 1969, to March 18, 1977.

Biography

Origins
Marien Ngouabi was born in 1938 at the village of Ombellé, Cuvette Department, in Kouyou territory to Dominique Osséré m'Opoma and Antoinette Mboualé-Abemba. He is origanlly from a humble family. From 1947 to 1953, he went to primary school in Owando. On 14 September 1953, he went to study at the Ecole des enfants de troupes Général Leclerc in Brazzaville and in 1957, he was sent to Bouar, Oubangui-Chari (now the Central African Republic).

After serving in Cameroon as a member of the second battalion of the tirailleurs with the rank of Sergeant (1958–1960), Ngouabi went to the Ecole Militaire Préparatoire in Strasbourg, France in September 1960 and then to the Ecole Inter-armes at Coëtquidan Saint-Cyr in 1961. He returned to Congo in 1962 as Second Lieutenant and was stationed at the Pointe-Noire garrison. He was assigned to the Pointe-Noire garrison as a deputy commander of an infantry battalion. In 1963, Ngouabi was promoted to the rank of Lieutenant.

Rise to power
In 1965, he created the first battalion of paratroopers in the Congo Republic. Known for his leftist views, in April 1966 Ngouabi was demoted to the rank of soldier second class when he refused to be posted again at Pointe-Noire, after rebelling against the army's inflexibility in politics and voicing strong criticism to the president. President Alphonse Massamba-Débat had Ngouabi and Second Lieutenant Eyabo arrested on July 29, 1968.

Ngouabi's arrest provoked discontent among the military, and on July 31, Ngouabi was freed by soldiers from the Civil Defense. The National Revolutionary Council (CNR), headed by Ngouabi, was created on August 5, 1968. On 1 October 1968, he was promoted to the rank of Commanding Officer, a rank he held until his death. Massamba-Débat, whose powers had been curtailed by the CNR, resigned on September 4, and Prime Minister Alfred Raoul served as acting head of state until December 31, 1968, when the CNR formally became the country's supreme authority and Ngouabi, as head of the CNR, assumed the presidency.

Head of state
Once in power, President NGOUABI changed the country's name to the People's Republic of the Congo, declaring it to be Africa's first Marxist–Leninist state, and founded the Congolese Workers' Party (Parti Congolais du Travail, PCT) as the country's unique legal political party.

NGOUABI was a Koyo from the north and his regime shifted control of the country away from the south. Such moves created the opposition among the population in the highly politicized environment of Brazzaville. Bureaucratic centralism, repression, the "mechanism" of the party apparatus, and Ngouabi's tribalist orientation towards Mboshi and La Cuvette immigrants created opposition within the Communist Party itself, especially its youth organization. In the fall of 1971, student and school that went on strikes in Brazzaville and Pointe Noire were severely repressed by the authorities. The situation in the country was severely destabilized. There was an attempted coup in February 1972 that triggered a series of 'purges' of the opposition. It is claimed that Ngouabi was under French pressure to annex the oil-rich Cabinda enclave, a part of Portuguese Angola, and his refusal to act cost him the French support. There is some speculation that the French financed several coups in order to remove NGOUABI in power. Starting in February 1973, the army began military operations in the Goma Tse-tse region to dismantle the M22 insurgency led by former army members lead by Vice President Ange Diawara. During the same month, Ngouabi denounced another attempted Diawara coup and arrested 45 people, including Pascal Lissouba and Sylvain Bemba, Minister of Information. His trial took place from March 16 to 23. Several sentences were pronounced, while Lissouba was acquitted.

The M22 business abruptly ended on April 24, 1973 with the capture and execution of the maquis. The bodies of Diawara, Ikoko and Bakekolo were toured around Brazzaville and exhibited by Ngouabi in person during a popular gathering held at the Stade de la Révolution. The lack of consideration for the lifeless bodies of the Maquis caused considerable disapproval nationally due to the cultural sensitivity surrounding the reverential treatment of dead bodies. He visited the People's Republic of China in July 1973.

Ngouabi was re-elected to his post as Chairman of the PCT Central Committee on December 30, 1974; he was additionally elected as Permanent Secretary of the PCT. He was then sworn in as President for another term on January 9, 1975. Also in 1975, he signed an economic aid pact with the Soviet Union.

On March 23, Lieutenant General Pierre Kinganga, in exile in Kinshasa in neighbouring Zaire since his alleged June 1969 coup attempt, disembarked in Brazzaville at the head of a commando attempting to overthrow the regime. His attempt failed and he was shot dead near the national radio station he had just taken. His body and that of his command members who fell with him remained exposed for a long time in front of the radio building. Several enthusiastic young supporters who had joined Kinganga's column were also armed. Captain Augustin Poignet, also involved, managed to escape to Kinshasa. A week later, 3 accomplices (Miawouama, Nkoutou and Mengo), sentenced by a court-martial, were executed. The command members and accomplices in the army and gendarmerie were convicted by the revolutionary court. After the events, Marien Ngouabi denounced the involvement of the CIA and President Mobutu Sese Seko of Zaire (now Democratic Republic of the Congo) in the coup.

Following this attempt, the PCT met in an extraordinary congress from March 30 to April 2, 1970. The Political Bureau was expanded to 10 members, to the benefit of Ambroise Noumazalaye and Captain Sassou N'Guesso. The Gendarmerie, whose loyalty was not complete during the events, was dissolved and its members joined the army. The Council of State was reorganized.

On August 29, 1970, former Minister Stéphane-Maurice Bongo-Nouarra was arrested for a counter-revolutionary conspiracy. He was sentenced to 10 years of forced labour.

Assassination
On March 18, 1977, at 14:30 hours, President Ngouabi was assassinated. Those accused of taking part in the assassination were tried and some were executed including Massamba-Débat.

In the aftermath of the assassination, the Military Committee of the Party (CMP) was named to head an interim government with the conservative Colonel Joachim Yhombi-Opango to serve as Head of State.

Commemoration
March 18 is Marien Ngouabi Day in the Republic of Congo. The country's only university is the Marien Ngouabi University in Brazzaville. Ngouabi is interred at the Marien Ngouabi Mausoleum in Brazzaville.

References

 
 

1938 births
1977 deaths
Assassinated heads of state
Deaths by firearm in the Republic of the Congo
Presidents of the Republic of the Congo
Leaders who took power by coup
Assassinated Republic of the Congo politicians
People murdered in the Republic of the Congo
Congolese Party of Labour politicians
National Movement of the Revolution politicians
Communism in the Republic of the Congo
People from Cuvette Department